Sun Java Studio Creator was a commercial integrated development environment based on NetBeans developed by Sun Microsystems. It was discontinued in 2007.

References

External links

Java platform
Java development tools
Integrated development environments
Linux integrated development environments